Chianese is an Italian surname. Notable people with the surname include:

Biaggio Chianese (born 1961), Italian boxer
Dominic Chianese (born 1931), American actor, singer and musician
Joel Chianese (born 1990), Australian soccer player
Mario Chianese (died 2020), Italian painter
Vincenzo Chianese (born 1976), Italian footballer

Italian-language surnames